The 1957 UCI Road World Championships took place on 18 August 1957 in Waregem, Belgium.

Events Summary

References

 
UCI Road World Championships by year
W
R
R